Albertini is an Italian surname. Notable people with the surname include:

 Demetrio Albertini (born 1971), Italian football (soccer) midfielder
 Ellen Albertini Dow (1913-2015), American actress
 Francesco Albertini (died 1510), Italian priest and author
 Gabriele Albertini (born 1950), former mayor of Milano and Member of the European Parliament 
 Ignazio Albertini (1644–1685), Italian Baroque musician and composer
 Joachim Albertini (1748–1812), Polish-Italian composer
 Johannes Baptista von Albertini (1769–1831), German botanist
 Luigi Albertini (1871–1941), Italian newspaper editor and historian of World War I
 Nicolò Albertini (c. 1250 – 1321), medieval Italian Cardinal and statesman
 Paul-Rene Albertini (born 1964), French music executive
 William Albertini (1913–1994), English cricketer
 Xavier Albertini (born 1971), French politician

Italian-language surnames
Patronymic surnames
Surnames from given names